Felipe Guillermo Morandé Lavín (born 15 May 1955) is a Chilean politician and lawyer who was the dean of the Major University.

In 2018, the President Sebastián Piñera during his second government (2018–2022) appointed him as the Ambassador of Chile in the OECD.

References

External links
 

1955 births
Living people
Chilean people
Chilean people of Catalan descent
Pontifical Catholic University of Chile alumni
University of Minnesota alumni
21st-century Chilean politicians
Evópoli politicians